This is a list of the regions of New Zealand by Human Development Index as of 2022 with data for the year 2021. The 2 most populated regions of New Zealand have the highest HDI, although the position of other regions has been variable across recent releases of the index.

Ranking

References 

Human Development Index
New Zealand
New Zealand, HDI